Agrippina is an ancient Roman cognomen and a feminine given name. People with either the cognomen or the given name include:

Cognomen
Relatives of the Roman general Marcus Vipsanius Agrippa:
 Vipsania Agrippina (36 BC–20 AD), first wife of the emperor Tiberius, daughter of Pomponia Caecilia Attica and Agrippa
 Vipsania Marcella Agrippina (likely born 28-22 BC), daughter of Claudia Marcella Major and Agrippa, married to general Publius Quinctilius Varus
 Vipsania Marcellina Agrippina (likely born between 27-21 BC), daughter of Claudia Marcella Major and Agrippa, married to Marcus Aemilius Lepidus
 Vipsania Julia Agrippina or Julia the Younger (19 BC–c. 29 AD), daughter of Julia the Elder and Agrippa
 Agrippina the Elder or Vipsania Agrippina (c. 14 BC–AD 33), daughter of Julia the Elder and Agrippa, wife of Germanicus and mother of emperor Caligula
 Agrippina the Younger or Julia Agrippina (15–59 AD), daughter of Agrippina the Elder and Germanicus, wife of emperor Claudius, mother of emperor Nero

Given name
 Agrippina of Mineo (died 262), Christian saint and martyr
 Agrippina or Gryfina of Halych (c. 1248–between 1305 and 1309), Princess of Kraków by marriage, later a nun and abbess
 Agrippina Fedorovna Chelyadnina, royal governess of Tsar Ivan the Terrible
 Agrippina de la Cruz (born 1960), Filipino hurdler
 Agrippina Shin (born 1958), Uzbek politician, Minister of Preschool Education since 2017
 Agrippina Vaganova (1879–1951), Russian ballerina and ballet teacher
 Agrippina Volkonskaia (died 1732), Russian courtier, senior lady-in-waiting of Catherine I of Russia

See also
 Agrippina (opera), opera by G. F. Handel
 Agrypina, 14th-century Lithuanian noblewoman
 Agrippa (disambiguation)
 Agrippinus (disambiguation)
 Vipsania (disambiguation)

Ancient Roman cognomina
Feminine given names